A polyphenol antioxidant is a hypothetical type of antioxidant containing a polyphenolic substructure and studied in vitro. Numbering over 4,000 distinct species mostly from plants, polyphenols may have antioxidant activity in vitro, but are unlikely to be antioxidants in vivo. Hypothetically, they may affect cell-to-cell signaling, receptor sensitivity, inflammatory enzyme activity or gene regulation, although high-quality clinical research has not confirmed any of these possible effects in humans .

Sources of polyphenols
The main source of polyphenols is dietary, since they are found in a wide array of phytochemical-bearing foods.  For example, honey; most legumes; fruits such as apples, blackberries, blueberries,  cantaloupe, pomegranate, cherries, cranberries, grapes, pears, plums, raspberries, aronia berries, and strawberries (berries in general have high polyphenol content) and vegetables such as broccoli, cabbage, celery, onion and parsley are rich in polyphenols. Red wine, chocolate, black tea, white tea, green tea, olive oil and many grains are sources. Ingestion of polyphenols occurs by consuming a wide array of plant foods.

Biochemical theory 
The regulation theory considers a polyphenolic ability to scavenge free radicals  and up-regulate certain metal chelation reactions.  Various reactive oxygen species, such as singlet oxygen, peroxynitrite and  hydrogen peroxide, must be continually removed from cells to maintain healthy metabolic function. Diminishing the concentrations of reactive oxygen species can have several benefits possibly associated with ion transport systems and so may affect redox signaling. There is no substantial evidence, however, that dietary polyphenols have an antioxidant effect in vivo.

The “deactivation” of oxidant species by polyphenolic antioxidants (POH) is based, with regard to food systems that are deteriorated by peroxyl radicals (R•), on the donation of hydrogen, which interrupts chain reactions: 
R• + PhOH → R-H + PhO•
Phenoxyl radicals (PO•) generated according to this reaction may be stabilized through resonance and/or intramolecular hydrogen bonding, as proposed for quercetin, or combine to yield dimerisation products, thus terminating the chain reaction:
PhO• + PhO•→ PhO-OPh

Potential biological consequences

Consuming dietary polyphenols have been evaluated for biological activity in vitro, but there is no evidence from high-quality clinical research  that they have effects in vivo. Preliminary research has been conducted and regulatory status was reviewed in 2009 by the U.S. Food and Drug Administration (FDA).:

 Inflammation such as in coronary artery disease.
 Other possible effects may result from consumption of foods rich in polyphenols, but are not yet proved scientifically in humans, so are not allowed as health statements by the FDA.

Difficulty in analyzing effects of specific chemicals 

It is difficult to evaluate the physiological effects of specific natural phenolic antioxidants, since such a large number of individual compounds may occur even in a single food and their fate in vivo cannot be measured.

Other more detailed chemical research has elucidated the difficulty of isolating individual phenolics. Because significant variation in phenolic content occurs among various brands of tea, there are possible inconsistencies among epidemiological studies implying beneficial health effects of phenolic antioxidants of green tea blends. The Oxygen Radical Absorbance Capacity (ORAC) test is a laboratory indicator of antioxidant potential in foods and dietary supplements. However, ORAC results cannot be confirmed to be physiologically applicable and have been designated as unreliable.

Practical aspects of dietary polyphenols

There is  debate regarding the total body absorption of dietary intake of polyphenolic compounds.  While some indicate potential health effects of certain specific polyphenols, most studies demonstrate low bioavailability and rapid excretion of polyphenols, indicating their potential roles only in small concentrations in vivo. More research is needed to understand the interactions between a variety of these chemicals acting in concert within the human body.

Topical application of polyphenols 
There is no substantial evidence that reactive oxygen species play a role in the process of skin aging. The skin is exposed to various exogenous sources of oxidative stress, including ultraviolet radiation whose spectral components may be responsible for the extrinsic type of skin aging, sometimes termed photoaging. Controlled long-term studies on the efficacy of low molecular weight antioxidants in the prevention or treatment of skin aging in humans are absent.

Combination of antioxidants in vitro
Experiments on linoleic acid subjected to 2,2′-azobis (2-amidinopropane) dihydrochloride-induced oxidation with different combinations of phenolics show that binary mixtures can lead to either a synergetic effect or to an antagonistic effect.

Antioxidant levels of purified anthocyanin extracts were much higher than expected from anthocyanin content indicating synergistic effect of anthocyanin mixtures.

Antioxidant capacity tests 
 Oxygen radical absorbance capacity (ORAC)
 Ferricyanide reducing power
 2,2-diphenyl-1-picrylhydrazyl radical scavenging activity

See also 
 List of phytochemicals in food
 List of antioxidants in food
 Health effects of polyphenols
 Free-radical theory
 Nitric oxide
 Resveratrol
 Astaxanthin

References

Angiology
Chemopreventive agents
 
Antioxidants